"3AM" is the third single to be released from Swedish producer and singer-songwriter Kleerup's debut album. "3AM" originally appeared, in a different form, as a B-side to fellow Swede Marit Bergman's single "Mama, I Remember You Now"; she wrote the lyrics and vocal melody for the song, while Kleerup provided an original instrumental for the version that appears on his album.

Track listing 
 "3AM" – 3:57
 "Throw Your Emotions in the Air" – 4:36
 "3am (Digital Dog Club Mix) – 6:02

Chart performance 
In May 2008, when the album was released, "3AM" charted due to extensive downloading. It charted at No. 52 on the Swedish singles chart, and enjoyed a two-week run.

Upon the singles official release, it re-charted and reached a new peak position of No. 35.

Chart positions

References 

2008 singles
Dance-pop songs
Songs written by Kleerup
2008 songs
EMI Records singles
Songs written by Marit Bergman